Odontobuthus doriae, the Yellow Iranian scorpion, is a species of scorpions belonging to the family Buthidae.

Description

These medium-sized scorpions show a basic coloration ranging from yellow to pale yellow.

Distribution
This species can be found in Iran and Iraq.

See also 

 OdK2, a potassium channel blocker present in the venom of Odontobuthus doriae.

References

 Thorell, 1876 : Études scorpiologiques. Atti della Società italiana di scienze naturali Genova, vol. 19, p. 75–272
 Vatanpour, Hossein · Jalali, Amir G Rowan, Edward · Rahim, Fakher Effects of odontobuthus doriae scorpion venom on mouse sciatic nerve. Iranian journal of pharmaceutical research

Buthidae
Scorpions described in 1876
Scorpions of Asia